Pomaderris flabellaris, commonly known as fan pomaderris, is a species of flowering plant in the family Rhamnaceae and is endemic to South Australia. It is a low shrub with fan-shaped leaves, and small clusters of woolly-hairy flowers.

Description
Both surfaces are covered with star-shaped hairs, densely so on the lower surface. Flowering occurs from August to October.

Taxonomy
Fan pomaderris was first formally described in 1858 by Siegfried Reissek who gave it the name Trymalium flabellare in the journal Linnaea: ein Journal für die Botanik in ihrem ganzen Umfange, oder Beiträge zur Pflanzenkundein from an unpublished description by Ferdinand von Mueller. In 1926, John McConnell Black changed the name to Pomaderris flabellaris.

Distribution and habitat
Pomaderris flabellaris grows in shallow soil and sand dunes on the Eyre Peninsula in South Australia.

References

Flora of South Australia
flabellaris
Plants described in 1858